Eupithecia kobayashii is a moth in the family Geometridae. It is found in Russia, Japan and Korea.

The wingspan is about 24 mm. The ground colour of the wings is dark grey brown.

References

Moths described in 1958
kobayashii
Moths of Asia